Dilinata is a village in the municipal unit of Argostoli, Cephalonia, Greece. It is situated on a mountain slope, at 400 m elevation. It is 2 km east of Davgata, 2 km north of Faraklata and 6 km northeast of Argostoli. The mountaintop of Evmorfia, elevation 1,043 m, is to the northeast. Dilinata suffered great damage from the 1953 Ionian earthquake.

It is the place of origin of Giorgos Kalafatis, the founder of Panathinaikos Athletic Club.

Historical population

External links
GTP Travel Pages

References

Populated places in Cephalonia